Maze Runner is a North American film trilogy, consisting of science-fiction dystopian action adventure films based on The Maze Runner novels by the American author James Dashner. Produced by Ellen Goldsmith-Vein and distributed by 20th Century Fox, the films star Dylan O'Brien, Kaya Scodelario, Thomas Brodie-Sangster, Ki Hong Lee, Dexter Darden, and Patricia Clarkson. Wes Ball directed all three films.

The first film, The Maze Runner, was released on September 19, 2014 and became a commercial success grossing over $348million worldwide. The second film, Maze Runner: The Scorch Trials was released on September 18, 2015, and was also a success, grossing over $312million worldwide. The film series concluded with the release of the third film, Maze Runner: The Death Cure on January 26, 2018, which grossed $288million worldwide.

Films

The Maze Runner (2014)

The film features Thomas, who wakes up trapped in a maze with a group of other boys. He has no memory of the outside world other than dreams about an organization known as WCKD (World Catastrophe Killzone Department). Only by piecing together fragments of his past with clues he discovers in the maze can Thomas hope to uncover his purpose and a way to escape.

Development for the film began in January 2011 when Fox purchased the film rights to Dashner's novel The Maze Runner. Principal photography began in Baton Rouge, Louisiana in May 2013 and ended in July. It was released on September 19, 2014.

Maze Runner: The Scorch Trials (2015)

The film features Thomas and his fellow Gladers as they search for clues about the organization known as WCKD. Their journey takes them to the Scorch, a desolate landscape filled with obstacles. Teaming up with resistance fighters, the Gladers take on WCKD's "vastly superior" forces and uncover its plans for them all.

Principal photography commenced in Albuquerque, New Mexico, in October 2014 and ended in January 2015. It was released on September 18, 2015.

Maze Runner: The Death Cure (2018)

In the finale to the Maze Runner saga, Thomas leads his group of escaped Gladers on their final and most dangerous mission yet. To save their friends, they must break into the legendary Last City, a WCKD-controlled safe zone designed to keep people out. They attempt to enter to rescue their friends, seeking answers to the questions the Gladers have been asking since they first arrived in the maze.

In March 2015, T.S. Nowlin, who co-wrote the first and wrote the second film, was hired to write Maze Runner: The Death Cure based on the novel The Death Cure. In September 2015, Ball was hired to direct the film. Ball said that the film would not be split into two films. Principal photography took place in Cape Town, South Africa between March and June 2017 for a January 26, 2018 release.

Future
Following the acquisition of 21st Century Fox by Disney in March 2019, Disney announced in April 2019 at their CinemaCon presentation that new Maze Runner films are in development.

Recurring cast and characters

Crew

Music

Reception

Box office performance

All Maze Runner films opened at number one at the North American box office during their opening weekend. In North America, the Maze Runner film series is the fifth-highest-grossing film series based on young adult books, after the film series of Harry Potter, The Hunger Games, The Twilight Saga, and The Divergent Series, respectively, earning $242million. Worldwide, it is the fourth-highest-grossing film series based on young-adult books, after the film series of Harry Potter, The Twilight Saga, and The Hunger Games, respectively, earning $949million from a $157million total production budget.

Critical and public response
The Maze Runner trilogy has received a mixed critical response, with the primary source of criticism being the plot and character development, although its performances and action sequences have been praised.

References

Series
20th Century Studios franchises
Action film series
Mystery film series
Science fiction film series
Teen film series
Thriller film series
Film series introduced in 2014
Trilogies